James Robson Douglas (1876-1934) was named the 13th Lieutenant Governor of Nova Scotia effective January 21, 1925, succeeding MacCallum Grant. He was born in Amherst, Nova Scotia, and was a broker by profession. Douglas resigned as lieutenant-governor on September 24, 1925, nine months into his term, and was replaced by James Tory.

References

1876 births
1934 deaths
Lieutenant Governors of Nova Scotia